Varlaam is a variant of the saint's name Barlaam, used in the Orthodox churches due to the Byzantine sound shift from /b/ to /v/. A shortened form is Varlam. It may refer to:

Places

Greece
 Varlaam, Greece, a village in the southern Ioannina regional unit in Epirus
 Monastery of Varlaam in Meteora, Thessaly, Greece

Romania
 Varlaam, a village in Gura Teghii Commune, Buzău County
 Varlaam, a village in Adunații-Copăceni Commune, Giurgiu County

People
 Varlaam, Metropolitan of Moscow, reigned 1511 to 1521
 Varlaam Moțoc, Metropolitan of Moldavia (1632-1653)
 Grigory Shyshatsky (1750-1820), a.k.a. Varlaam, Archbishop of Mogilev
 Varlaam of Chikoy (1774-1846)
 Varlaam, a character in Alexander Pushkin's drama Boris Godunov and its adaptations
 Victor Sylvestrovych Solowij (1891-1966), a.k.a.  Archbishop Varlaam

See also
 Barlaam (disambiguation), the Western form
 Varlam, a shortened form